Nicholas Sparks (born 1965) is an American author. 

Nicholas Sparks may also refer to:

Nicholas Sparks (politician) (1794–1862), land owner and member of the first city council of Ottawa, Canada
Nick Sparks (Alabama politician), Democratic candidate for 2008 elections for the United States House of Representatives representing Alabama's 4th District